Harris Academy Merton (formerly Tamworth Manor High School, and prior to that Pollards Hill High School) is a secondary school and sixth form located in the London Borough of Merton district of Mitcham. When inspected by Ofsted in 2012, it was judged to be outstanding.

History 

In 2004 Merton council decided that Tamworth Manor School should cease to be maintained by the local council but become an academy. This led to protests. The decision had been taken by the Labour administration on Merton Council and was strongly supported by the local MP Siobhain McDonagh and Labour councillors. It was opposed by the then Conservative opposition on Merton Council. Rob MacDonald, an activist in the Socialist Party and brought the case to the High Court. He urged parents to contest the "privatisation" of education.

But on 27 July 2006 the High Court decided that the closure of Tamworth Manor school, to make way for an academy, should be allowed to go ahead. .

Academy
The school saw its GCSE results increase from 32% under the former Tamworth Manor High School to 40% 5A-C GCSEs in the result that were published in August 2007.
The school has become over-subscribed. After 8 years of service for the Academy, the Executive Principal, Mr Andy Halpin would be retiring to let Mr Leo Gilbert take the job on a full-time permanent basis. New Principal Aisha Samad saw the results decrease from 57% in 2015 to 37% in 2016.

It was last inspected by Ofsted in 2012.The school was judged to be 'outstanding'. As such it is exempt from further section 5 inspections.

Description

Harris Federation 

The Harris Federation of South London schools is a federation of academies originally in five South London boroughs. There are twenty-eight secondary schools in the federation at the end of 2020, with plans to expand further. The schools are all sponsored by the Lord Harris of Peckham, who is investing around £2 Million into them to make new facilities and for re-development of certain schools.

Harris Academy Merton
The academy is part of the Harris Federation of South London schools. The academy takes in students from both genders between the ages of 11 and 19. The academy serves an ethnically diverse community. In 2012 the largest ethnic group was Black or Black British but there was significant number of Asian and Asian British students. About 28% of students were disabled or had special educational needs. Fifteen per cent were supported through school action, and 13.5%  school action plus or with a statement of special educational needs. These proportions are both above national averages. Nearly 40% of its students are known to be eligible for the pupil premium again significantly above the national average.

The 2012 Ofsted report complimented the highly skilled teachers who understood their pupils and tailored their teaching to their needs. As a result, students attainment is above the national average.

The academy opened a sixth form in September 2007. Courses are offered on site in conjunction with Harris CTC, with whom the academy has good links .

Academics
Virtually all maintained schools and academies follow the National Curriculum, and are inspected by Ofsted on how well they succeed in delivering a 'broad and balanced curriculum'.: schools also endeavour to get all students to achieve the English Baccalaureate (EBACC) qualification. This must include core subjects a modern foreign language, and either History or Geography. The EBacc includes subjects which are considered "essential to many degrees and open up lots of doors".

Key Stage 4 students are taught in blocks of 50 minute lessons each day. There are 6 lessons a day for all students and 7 on Monday and Tuesday for 
Key Stage 4 Year  10  and  11  students. The   curriculum   offer  is annually reviewed against the neds of that year group, statutory   requirements  and recommendations from external agencies. PHSE and Citizenship is delivered in a variety of ways by assemblies, tutors and visiting experts.

In Key Stage 3 there will be a top set, three mixed ability sets and a lower set, where support can be concentrated.

In Key Stage 4 where all students will do core subjects and two appropriate options
Students  will  be  set  by  ability  in the  core  subjects  and  wherever  possible  in  the foundation  subjects,  where more than one group is timetabled in the same option option block.

Location 
The academy is located on the edge of Wide Way and Recreation Drive, north of Mitcham Common in an area called Pollards Hill. The nearest train stations are at Norbury and Mitcham Eastfields, with the nearest Tramlink stop being at Beddington Lane station which are all about a 20-minute walk  from the school.

References

External links 
Official website
Merton School Sport Partnership
Old Tamworth Manor High School website

Academies in the London Borough of Merton
Secondary schools in the London Borough of Merton
Merton
Educational institutions established in 2006
2006 establishments in England